Capella Films, Inc. was a film production company founded in 1990 and headquartered in Los Angeles, California. Formed by Hamburg-based Deyhle-Baer Media Holdings, Capella Films constituted the production branch to Capella Intl. which specialised in foreign distribution.

Together, Capella Films and Capella Intl. operated a highly active production and distribution hub whose partners included Universal Studios, German distributor, Connexion Films, American production arm, Connexion American Media Inc., Bregman-Baer Productions, and April-Connexion Films.  Capella Films, Inc. formed a $1.3billion acquisition attempt for Metro-Goldwyn-Mayer/United Artists in 1997. The company was later merged into Bloom Media in 2012. This company is also not to be confused with Russian film company Capella Film.

Organization
Capella Films and Capella International company principals were responsible for the financing, and/or production, distribution, acquiring of full international or selective territorial rights for the following motion pictures; Austin Powers: International Man of Mystery starring Mike Myers, Ace Ventura: Pet Detective, The Mask, and Dumb and Dumber all of which starred Canadian born actor Jim Carrey, Brian De Palma’s Carlito’s Way starring Al Pacino, and The Real McCoy starring Kim Basinger. Capella Intl. emphasized  alternating foreign distribution rights with Universal, which handled a number of their domestic distribution releases during the early nineties. The company maintained layers of relationships, both contractual and personal, with distributors to the extent that they were essentially co-producers on many exterior films, meaning the net result was profitable ties to selected partners that bypassed the traditional bidding wars that usually accompanied foreign distribution deals. Critically, the company was structured around occupying multiple sites in the production and distribution chain, in order to better control the development and flow of product and revenue, and thereby operate more profitably than their competitors.

Motion pictures
Capella Films and Capella International company principals were responsible for the financing, and/or production, acquiring of full international or selective territorial rights for the following motion pictures:
Ace Ventura: Pet Detective (1994)
Austin Powers: International Man of Mystery (1997)
A Business Affair (1994)
Carlito's Way (1993)
Dumb and Dumber (1994)
Four Weddings and a Funeral (1994)
The Mask (1994)
My Life (1993)
Nobody's Fool (1995)
The Real McCoy (1993)
The Russian Singer (1993)
The Shadow (1994)
Shattered (1991)
The Surgeon (1995)
Two Bits (1995)

References

External links
 BusinessWeek.com
 TheFreeLibrary.com website

Film distributors of the United States
Film production companies of the United States
Entertainment companies based in California
Companies based in Los Angeles
Mass media companies established in 1990
Mass media companies disestablished in 2012
1990 establishments in California